Little Man, What Now? is a 1933 German drama film directed by Fritz Wendhausen and starring Hermann Thimig, Hertha Thiele and Viktor de Kowa. It is an adaptation of the novel of the same name by Hans Fallada. The original concept for the film was to take a naturalistic approach, the same way the novel did, with Kurt Weill composing the music. Fallada had already remarked in 1932, after falling out with the producers and script writers, that the film had little to do with his novel, and that the script writers "would take a different approach," which they did.  The Nazi Film Review Office insisted on extensive cuts, including all scenes featuring the Comedian Harmonists. 

It was shot at the Johannisthal Studios in Berlin. The film's sets were designed by the art directors Willy Schiller and Otto Guelstorff. Location shooting took place around Swinemünde. It was well received by contemporary critics, many of whom considered it the best German film of 1933. A separate American film adaptation of Fallada's novel, Little Man, What Now?, was released in 1934.

Plot 
The young accountant Hans Pinneberg lives in the provinces with his wife, who he affectionately calls “Laemmchen”. He has to keep his marriage to beautiful young Emma a secret because his boss plans to marry him off to his daughter. When the truth comes out, Hans is released. Now Hans' stepmother in Berlin has to help. She and her shady lover try to support the young couple by providing Hans and his wife with an apartment in their house. But Hans ends up in prison. When he is released, it dawns on him that his stepmother runs a brothel. Hans and Lammchen leave their apartment to stay with a street vendor friend of theirs. This time there seems to because for cautious optimism.

Cast
 Hermann Thimig as Pinneberg
 Hertha Thiele as Emma 'Lämmchen' Mörchel
 Viktor de Kowa as Heilbutt
 Ida Wüst as Pinnebergs Mutter
 Fritz Kampers as Jachmann
 Paul Henckels as Lehmann
 Theo Lingen as Der Verkäufer
 Jakob Tiedtke as Kleinholz
 Hugo Flink as Jaenicke
 Aenne Goerling as Frau Kleinholz
 Blandine Ebinger as Kleinholz' Tochter
 Günther Vogdt as Lauterbach
 Albert Hörrmann as Schulz
 Carl Auen as Kriminalbeamter
 Willi Tholen as Kriminalbeamter
 Comedian Harmonists as Themselves (scenes deleted)

References

Bibliography 
 
 Klaus, Ulrich J. Deutsche Tonfilme: Jahrgang 1933. Klaus-Archiv, 1988.

External links 
 

1933 films
Films of the Weimar Republic
German drama films
1933 drama films
1930s German-language films
Films directed by Fritz Wendhausen
Films based on German novels
Films with screenplays by Fritz Wendhausen
German black-and-white films
Tobis Film films
1930s German films
Films shot at Johannisthal Studios
Adaptations of works by Hans Fallada